Igor Kachmazov may refer to:

 Igor Kachmazov (footballer, born 1962), Soviet and Russian footballer
 Igor Kachmazov (footballer, born 1968) (1968-2019), Soviet and Russian footballer